Inmarsat-4 F3 is a communications I-4 satellite operated by the British satellite operator Inmarsat. It was launched into a geosynchronous orbit at 22:43 GMT on 18 August 2008, by a Proton-M/Briz-M Enhanced carrier rocket. It is currently located at 97.65° West longitude, providing coverage of the Americas. It entered service on 7 January 2009.

Like the earlier Inmarsat-4 F1 and F2 satellites, Inmarsat-4 F3 was constructed by EADS Astrium, using a Eurostar E3000  bus. It has a mass of 5,960 kilograms, and is expected to operate for 13 years. It was originally slated for launch using an Atlas V 531, but was transferred to Proton due to a large backlog of Atlas launches.

In the United States, Inmarsat ground stations are licensed to operate at 1525-1559 MHz and 1626.5-1660.5 MHz.  The 1544-1545 MHz and 1645.5-1646.5 MHz bands are reserved for safety and distress communications.

References

External links
http://www.inmarsat.com/corporate/our-satellites/index.htm 
https://web.archive.org/web/20120927021531/http://www.boeing.com/news/releases/2005/q4/nr_051108s.html
http://www.as.northropgrumman.com/products/aa_inmarsat/index.html 

Spacecraft launched in 2008
Communications satellites in geostationary orbit
Satellites using the Eurostar bus
Inmarsat satellites